John Lewis Beaven  (30 July 1930 in Newport, Gwent – 11 April 2004) was a British diplomat.

Beaven underwent his national service in the RAF from 1948 to 1950. He joined the Foreign Office in 1956, serving as an Assistant Trade Commissioner in Karachi until 1960. After a succession of postings in Asia and Africa over the following decades, Beaven was Consul-General in San Francisco (1982-1986) and finally Ambassador to Sudan (1986-1990).

Honours
  Companion of the Order of St Michael and St George (CMG)
  Commander of the Royal Victorian Order (CVO)

References

1930 births
2004 deaths
Members of HM Diplomatic Service
People from Newport, Wales
Commanders of the Royal Victorian Order
Companions of the Order of St Michael and St George
Ambassadors of the United Kingdom to Sudan
20th-century British diplomats